Justin Fox Greenlaw Foxton  (24 September 1849 – 23 June 1916) was an Australian barrister and politician. He served in the Queensland Legislative Assembly from 1883 to 1904 and held ministerial office in several liberal governments. He later represented the seat of Brisbane in federal parliament (1906–1910) and was a minister without portfolio under Alfred Deakin. He was a long-serving member of Queensland's colonial militia and gained the rank of colonel.

Early life
Foxton was born in Melbourne on 24 September 1849. He was the son of Isabel Elizabeth (née Potts) and John Greenlaw Foxton. His father was a sea captain who arrived in the Port Phillip District in 1841.

Foxton was educated at Melbourne Grammar School from 1859 to 1862. He moved to Queensland in 1864 and briefly worked as a jackeroo, then read law with John Malbon Thompson in Ipswich. He was called to the Queensland Bar in 1871 and the following year established a practice at the Stanthorpe tinfields. In 1878 he formed a partnership with Thompson in Brisbane.

Politics

Foxton held the Legislative Assembly seat of Carnarvon from 1883 until 1904. Defeated at the 1904 elections he entered federal politics as a member for Brisbane in the House of Representatives in 1906, and was minister without portfolio in the third Deakin ministry from June 1909 to April 1910, when he was defeated at the general election.

Foxton joined the old volunteer forces when a very young man and rose to be brigadier in command of the Queensland field force (Commonwealth military forces). He represented Australia at the Imperial conference on naval and military defence of empire in 1909, and was for some time aide-de-camp to the Governor General of Australia. Foxton brought in a Factories and Shops Act in 1896 which showed a distinct advance in humanitarian legislation, and its provisions were further extended in his factories and shops act of 1900. These acts made him justly known as the father of shop and factory legislation in Queensland. He also implemented the 1901 Aboriginals Protection and Restriction of the Sale of Opium Act. This Act, the first effective such measure in Queensland, implemented a system of policed missions and reserves and stopped some female exploitation.

Personal life
Foxton married Emily Panton in 1874, with whom he had two sons and a daughter. He was keenly interested in cricket, serving as president of the Queensland Cricket Association, chairman of trustees of the Brisbane Cricket Ground, and a member of the Australian Board of Control.

Foxton died at Brisbane of cerebro-vascular disease on 23 June 1916. His funeral proceeded from his former residence, Bulimba House to the Toowong Cemetery in Brisbane.

References
 

 Justin Fox Greenlaw (1849 - 1916) — Australian Dictionary of Biography

External links

1849 births
1916 deaths
Members of the Australian House of Representatives
Members of the Australian House of Representatives for Brisbane
Members of the Queensland Legislative Assembly
Free Trade Party members of the Parliament of Australia
Commonwealth Liberal Party members of the Parliament of Australia
Australian Companions of the Order of St Michael and St George
Burials at Toowong Cemetery
20th-century Australian politicians
Australian barristers